Sir James Puckering Gibson, 1st Baronet (14 August 1849 – 11 January 1912), was a Scottish Liberal Party politician. He was Lord Provost of Edinburgh 1906-9 and Liberal MP for Edinburgh East from 1909 to 1912.

Private life
He was a son of Thomas Gibson, JP. He was educated at the Edinburgh Institution and Edinburgh University. He married, in 1874, Miss Potter of Barton Park, Derby. They had no children. He was created a Baronet in 1909. From 1880 until his death he lived at 33 Regent Terrace.

He was married to Marian Potter (d.1945).

Professional career
He was a Member of the Edinburgh Merchant Company and the Edinburgh Chamber of Commerce.

Political career
Lord Provost, Edinburgh, 1906–09. He was the successful Liberal candidate for the Edinburgh East Division at the 1909 Edinburgh East by-election.

He sat until his death in 1912 aged 62.

He is buried on the north side of the main east-west path in Dean Cemetery in Edinburgh under a large pale grey granite obelisk.

Election results

References

External links 
 

1849 births
1912 deaths
Members of the Parliament of the United Kingdom for Edinburgh constituencies
Scottish Liberal Party MPs
UK MPs 1906–1910
UK MPs 1910
UK MPs 1910–1918
Baronets in the Baronetage of the United Kingdom
Alumni of the University of Edinburgh
People educated at Stewart's Melville College
Lord Provosts of Edinburgh